Seeds is the second studio album by American rock band Brother Cane, released July 4, 1995 on Virgin Records. It features one of the group's most popular singles, "And Fools Shine On", which charted at #1 on the Billboard Mainstream Rock Tracks and ranked #5 on the year-end Top Hot Album Rock Tracks list. That same year, "Fools Shine On" was featured on the Halloween: The Curse of Michael Myers soundtrack. In addition, "Hung On a Rope", "20/20 Faith", and "Horses & Needles" were also featured in the film.

Reception

Brother Cane's sophomore effort was not reviewed by many significant publications. However, Allmusic gave Seeds a high rating, calling it "a slick, heavy recording that dares to oppose '90s punk rock with their own combination of classic '70s rock and '90s grunge."

Track listing

Personnel
 David Anderson – Guitar, backing vocals
 Scott Collier – Drums
 Roman Glick – Bass, backing vocals
 Damon Johnson – Lead vocals / guitar
 Joey Huffman - Keyboards
 Steve Ramos - congas, percussion
 Mixed by Tim Palmer

Singles

References

1995 albums
Virgin Records albums
Brother Cane albums
Albums produced by Marti Frederiksen
Grunge albums